The Thailand national football team represents Thailand in senior international football and is controlled by the Football Association of Thailand.

In the regional competition, Thailand is the most successful football team in Southeast Asia with seven AFF Championship trophies and nine senior-level gold medals from the Southeast Asian Games, the most of any Southeast Asian country. In higher levels, Thailand achieved the third place in the 1972 AFC Asian Cup where it was the host, and has totally seven appearances in the AFC Asian Cup so far. Furthermore, the team reached the fourth-place in the 1990 and 1998 Asian Games and participated in the Summer Olympics twice. However, Thailand has failed to obtain higher achievements in the continental and global records. The team obtained first ever win in the AFC Asian Cup in 2007 and had to wait 47 years to finally sneak out of the group stage in 2019. Thailand also advanced to the final round of World Cup qualification twice, in 2002 and 2018, but failed to qualify for the FIFA World Cup.

History

1915–1995: dynastic establishment 

The team's predecessor, which operated under the name of Siam, was founded in 1915 and played its first unofficial match against a team of Europeans at the Royal Bangkok Sports Club Stadium on 20 December that year. The team played its first international match in 1930 against the Indochina national team, which included both South Vietnamese and French players.

Thailand appeared in the 1956 Summer Olympics in Melbourne, where they've lost to Great Britain 0–9 is largest till date, thus failed to advance to the quarter-finals. In 1959, Thailand as the host won silver medals in the Southeast Asian Peninsular Games after losing 1–3 to South Vietnam in the final. In 1965, Thailand harbored its first distinct title: the very first place in the Southeast Asian Games. They made their second and latest appearance at the Summer Olympics in 1968, losing all three matches by at least 3 goals margin to Bulgaria, Guatemala, and Czechoslovakia hence en route to a first-round exit.

During the 1992 AFC Asian Cup qualification, Thailand gained a significant success defeating South Korea 2–1 and Bangladesh 1–0 to top the group and qualify to the 1992 AFC Asian Cup. The team's performance at the final tournament was drawing first two matches with Qatar and eventual 3rd place China then losing 0–4 to Saudi Arabia. In 1994, manager Thawatchai Sartjakul assembled a team that has been denounced as the "dream team" with players like Kiatisuk Senamuang, Tawan Sripan and Dusit Chalermsan.

1996–2016: flag bearer of Southeast Asia 

In 1996, Thailand defeated Malaysia 1–0 and win the ASEAN Football Championship (then called the Tiger Cup) for the first time. Thailand were favorites to regain the crown in 2007, 2008 and 2012 only to lose tight finals to Singapore and Vietnam respectively.

The regional 1998 Tiger Cup saw Thailand met Indonesia in a match that ill-hearted players from both team deliberately making actions aimed to avoid facing hosts Vietnam in the semi-finals and undergoing technical burden of moving training bases from Ho Chi Minh City to Hanoi. FIFA fined both teams $40,000 for "violating the spirit of the game". Thailand eventually lost the match, inevitably encountered and failed to Vietnam in the semi-finals.

Thailand consecutively qualified to and participated in two AFC Asian Cup final tournaments both held within Western Asia in 1996 and 2000 when their "dream team" was beginning its golden period. Coincidentally in both editions, the team's opponents all came from Western Asia and they are Saudi Arabia, Lebanon, Iran and Iraq, with the latter two share the same group with Thailand twice. In both editions, Thailand made two draws and lost the rest, bottomed the group stage of the first and is the worst third-placed team of the second edition.

The final 2000 AFF Championship match between Thailand and Indonesia, at a sold out Rajamangala, was almost a carbon copy of their group stage's encounter. The War Elephants triumphed 4–1 again with Worrawoot setting up camp at the opponents' goal. The 28-year-old scored twice in their first match and in the final struck a hat-trick in the first 32 minutes. In the final 2002 AFF Cup final, Thailand again met Indonesia (who was now the host) and won the game in penalty shootout despite taking a 2–0 lead.

Thailand again qualified to the Asian Cup in 2004 and was put into a group with Japan, Iran and debutant Oman. Despite vast experiences in the Asian Cup, the team has yet to show a sign of improvement as they lost all matches and became the worst-performed team in the whole tournament.

The sign of improving only came in the 2007 AFC Asian Cup when Thailand participated as a well-prepared co-host and was placed with the debutant Australia, Oman, and Iraq. The team manages a draw to Iraq and a historic win over Oman. With 4 points ahead, Thailand's chance to qualify to the next round for the first time since 1972 was all but shattered by the likes of Australia in a 0–4 demolition. The tournament witnessed the end of Thailand's recognizable generation with later retirements of Kiatisuk, Tawan, and Pipat.

In September 2008, Thailand signed a four-year contract with the English coach Peter Reid but Reid left his position by mutual consent after only a year in charge as his team fail to clinch the championship of 2008 AFF Championship after 2–3 on aggregate lost to Vietnam in the finals.

In September 2009, Bryan Robson agreed to coach Thailand in his first foray into international football management and was contracted to manage the team through to the 2014 World Cup. In November, Robson celebrated his first competitive match in charge of the team with an away victory against Singapore in a 2011 Asian Cup qualifying group match but then lose to the same opponent back home. Then, two goalless draws with Jordan and Iran in January 2010 and an 0–1 away lost to Iran in March all effectively ended the chance of qualifying for the 2011 AFC Asian Cup. In preparations for the 2010 AFF Championship, Robson led Thailand to victorious run against Singapore and Bob Houghton's India in a series of friendlies. However, when entering the tournament in December, he failed to bring Thailand past group A after managing only draws against Laos and Malaysia and losing to Indonesia.

Robson resigned as Thailand's manager on 8 June 2011, citing health problems as the reason and was replaced by Winfried Schäfer, who would be the ninth German person to coach the Thailand team.

The new coach called up starlets for the 2014 World Cup qualifiers and have the starting set of matches losing minimal to Australia, defeating Oman 3–0 and drawing Saudi Arabia but did not make it after losing to these teams altogether in the second set. In the 2012 AFF Championship, Thailand topped their group and surpassed Malaysia in semi-finals but handed the crown to Singapore in the finals. In the 2015 Asian Cup qualification, Thailand showed setback with its defensive frailties exposed by Middle Eastern rivals (Iran, Kuwait, Lebanon) when losing all 6 games in the qualifiers, conceding 21 goals in the process.

In June 2013, Schäfer cancelled his contract. The FA of Thailand appointed the former player Kiatisuk Senamuang as the new caretaker coach for the national team. His first ride was a friendly against China PR on 15 June, which Thailand surprisingly won 5–1.

In 2014, Thailand ended a 12-year drought of the AFF Championship title from the late goals by Charyl Chappuis and Chanathip Songkrasin which gave them a dramatic 4–3 aggregate victory over Malaysia in the second leg of the finals at Bukit Jalil. The team did not lose any match up until the second leg of the finals and often featured a tiki-taka playing style, for instance including 27 consecutive passes during the first leg of the finals against Malaysia. Kiatisuk consequently became the first person to win the ASEAN Football Championship as both a player and a coach. Thailand succeeded in protecting AFF Championship reign two years later in 2016, defeating Indonesia 3–2 aggregately despite losing the first leg.

In 2015, evasion fuelled hope for both the players and Thailand fans of finally reaching the World Cup tournament and tension is mounting as the national team commenced AFC's second round for 2018 World Cup qualification. Teerasil Dangda, Thailand's renowned striker, rejoined the rank of the national team after his loan with UD Almería ended earlier. Drawn in Group F along with Chinese Taipei, Iraq and Vietnam, who Thailand played first match home against on 24 May and can only be won by a victory goal from a shot 20 yards away. They played a much easier match at the same opponent's home soil, winning 3–0. Thailand won both matches against Chinese Taipei and drew 2–2 both matches against Iraq, allowing them to qualify for the next round as group F winners.
In the last round, Kiatisuk's men shared the same group with Australia, Japan, Saudi Arabia, UAE along with previous opponent, Iraq. Again, Thailand was eliminated without winning a match and recorded only two points out of ten matches.

2017–present: Rebuilding to achieve the continental success 

Since taking over the administration by Somyot Poompanmoung, FA Thailand aims to drive men's national football team to be one of the leading teams in Asia by which there are concrete 20 years development plans and preparations. After the elimination from World Cup qualifiers, Kiatisuk resigned and Thailand appointed Milovan Rajevac as a coach, thus marked the first non-Brazilian/German/English team's chief. With the new coach, however, Thailand failed to defend its AFF Championship title in 2018 when losing Malaysia in the semi-finals by the away goals rule.

Ahead of 2019 AFC Asian Cup, Thailand was drawn into group A together with the host UAE, Bahrain and India. Rajevac oversaw Thailand in the commencing 1–4 loss to India. The Serbian coach was sacked and his assistant, Sirisak Yodyardthai became the interim coach on 7 January. Sirisak guided Thailand to a 1–0 win over Bahrain and a 1–1 draw with the host UAE, enough to move on to the knockout stage of the AFC Asian Cup for the first time in 47 years. Their success was greeted with congratulation from the FA. Thailand encountered China in the round of sixteen, taking an early lead but eventually lost 2–1 as China make their decisive respond.

After finishing in the fourth place of 2019 King's Cup and losing the rival Vietnam in that tournament, Sirisak had resigned and FA Thailand appointed the Japanese coach Akira Nishino, who had brought Japan to the round of 16 of 2018 FIFA World Cup, for replacement. This was the first-ever Asian coach becoming Thailand's head coach. The team was drawn into group G of the second round of 2022 World Cup qualification with other three Southeast Asian rivals: Vietnam, Malaysia, Indonesia; along with the UAE. Despite defeating Indonesia 3-0 and the UAE 2–1, Thailand failed to revenge Vietnam when getting goalless draws in both legs, while losing Malaysia 1–2 in Bukit Jalil. With these results, Thailand could only get the third place in group G after five qualifying matches. After a one-year disruption due to COVID-19 pandemic, Thailand and other teams in group G had to play their remaining matches in Dubai, UAE. However, the team suffered a huge loss of key players when Chanathip Songkrasin was injured, while Teerasil Dangda and Theerathon Bunmathan refused to participate the qualification due to various reasons. Without these three players, Thailand showed a poor performance in Dubai - drawn the bottom place team Indonesia 2–2, then lost the UAE 1–3 and Malaysia 0–1, respectively; which eventually pushed the team down to the fourth place of the group G. Nishino did not come back to Thailand to explain the team's failure, but unilaterally returning to Japan, which made FA Thailand appoint Anurak Srikerd as the caretaker and consider sacking Nishino in upcoming days. On 29 July 2021, shortly after Nishino came back to Thailand, FA Thailand decided to terminate the contract with Nishino.

On 28 September 2021, Alexandré Pölking was appointed as the head coach of the Thailand national team, replacing Akira Nishino. Pölking's first task was the 2020 AFF Championship in December 2021. Between 5 December 2021 and 1 January 2022, Polking accomplished the very task as he managed the War Elephants to win 6–2 on aggregate after being held to a 2–2 second-leg draw by Indonesia's Garuda, guiding Thailand to win the AFF Championship for the sixth time.

Image

Colours

In older days, the primary kits worn are all red.

The Thai senior national team used to play with a kit made by local provider FBT. This contract lasted until June 2007.

In July 2007, Nike became kit providers, and from October that year, the team played in an all-yellow home kit in honour of King Bhumibol Adulyadej's 80th birthday (yellow being the royal color), having used two other yellow kits in friendlies against China on 16 May 2007 and Qatar on 2 July 2007.

From October 2012 through 2016, Nike was replaced by Grand Sport in a deal worth 96M baht (3.1M USD). The new home kit of Thailand reverted to all-red and the away kit to all-blue. However, the order was reversed from the 2014 AFF Championship onward.

In September 2016, the national team signed a four-year contract with Warrix Sports to be their kit provider from 2017. On 4 January 2017, the new provider introduced a new pair of Thailand kits that was all black home and all white away, honouring their late King Bhumibol for a year after his passing, with black and white being the traditional Thai colors of mourning.

In March 2018, Warrix returned Thailand to the all-blue first, all-red second kits with an addition of a white-black third kit.

In December 2018, a new, darker version of blue, red kits and an all white third kit were presented for the 2019 AFC Asian Cup campaign and the rest of 2019. For the 2019 King's Cup in May, Warrix released the kit consisting of a yellow shirt with white shorts and socks – yellow reportedly being the favorite color of the newly crowned King Maha Vajiralongkorn.

Rivalries

Notable rivalries 
Thailand has rivalries with Myanmar, Singapore, Malaysia, Indonesia and Vietnam. These rivalries are rooted in geographical proximity.

Thailand's greatest rival is Malaysia, the two teams having played each other 97 times. Before Malaysia fell into football scandal that weakened the country's football development from the 1990s to 2018, Malaysia was Thailand's most annoying and difficult opponent in the region. Despite the football scandal, Thailand have not defeated the Malaysians on their home turf since 1990. Thailand have better records in international football competitions than the Malaysians. Still, Thailand's overall record against Malaysia is not favorable with only 29 wins, 31 draws and 37 losses to the Malayan Tigers.

The rivalry between Thailand and Singapore is a newer one and its importance can be emphasized by the domination of both countries in the AFF Championship with Thailand winning five times and Singapore winning four. Up until 2012, Singapore and Thailand have been the more dominant forces in Southeast Asian football. Thailand has a decided head-to-head advantage on Singapore, beating the Singaporeans 33 times, drawing 17 times and losing 12 times. Football development in both countries have been different with Thailand relies mostly on its own domestically developed players while Singapore has been reliant on naturalized players.

Thailand's rivalry with Vietnam has developed differently from times. During the time of South Vietnam and North Vietnam, Thailand had a poorer performance with the team only won 4 matches against the South Vietnamese. However, when Vietnam rejoined international football at 1991, Thailand has been more dominant than their eastern rival, winning 14 matches.

When Myanmar was still a football power, it was Thailand's first-ever rival, owning by the history of the Burmese–Siamese wars which led to a nationalist fervor among Thai fans with its desire to beat the Burmese. But with Myanmar weakened following the reign of Ne Win and junta, Thailand improved and since 1983, holds an undefeated streak over its western rival. The rivalry today only serves mostly in the memoir of Burmese fans who are nostalgic to an era when Myanmar was still a leading football power, while for some Thai fans, they have more important opponents to concentrate at. Thailand has 21 wins, 14 draws and 15 losses to Myanmar.

Indonesia has met Thailand in three finals of the AFF Championship at 2000, 2002 and 2016, and Thailand all triumphed at the expense of Indonesia. It's been said that while Thailand was able to elevate its position to become a more serious Asian competitor, Indonesia fell into mismanagement and matches between two teams also began to lose its importance. Thailand has a decided edge in head-to-head matchups against Indonesia, with 33 wins and 18 losses and 18 draws.

Facilities 
Most home matches took place in Rajamangala National Stadium in Bang Kapi District of Bangkok. Built for the 1998 Asian Games, the stadium is the largest sporting facility in Thailand with a capacity of 49,749, all seated. International matches are also occasionally played at Supachalasai Stadium, 700th Anniversary Stadium, 80th Birthday Stadium, Thammasat Stadium, Chang Arena and SCG Stadium.

Results and fixtures

Fixtures are broadcast by Thairath TV (for friendlies and round 2 of FIFA World Cup - AFC qualification matches) and Channel 7 (for the AFF Mitsubishi Electric Cup, possible round 3 of FIFA World Cup - AFC qualification and AFC Asian Cup matches, due to broadcasting contract with Lagardère Sports and Entertainment).
 Record only the results that affect the FIFA/Coca-Cola World Ranking. See FIFA 'A' matches criteria.

2022

2023

Coaches

Coaching history 

  Bunchoo Samutkojon (1956–1964)
  Pratiab Thesvisarn (1965–1968)
  Günther Glomb (1968–1975)
  Naowarat Patanon (1975)
  Peter Schnittger (1976–1978)
  Werner Bickelhaupt (1979)
  Vichit Yamboonraungb (1979)
  Supakit Meelarpkit (1980)
  Prawit Chaisam (1981–1983, 1988–1989)
  Yanyong Na Nongkhai (1983)
  Saner Chaiyong (1984)
  Burkhard Ziese (1985–1986)
  Chirtsak Chaiyaboot (1987)
  Carlos Roberto (1989–1991)
  Peter Stubbe (1991–1994)
  Worawit Sumpachanyasathit (1994)
  Chatchai Paholpat (1994–1995, 2004)
  Thawatchai Sartjakul (1996)
  Arjhan Srong-ngamsub (1996)
  Dettmar Cramer (1997)
  Witthaya Laohakul (1997–1998)
  Peter Withe (1998–2003)
  Carlos Roberto (2003–2004)
  Sigfried Held (2004)
  Charnwit Polcheewin (2005–2008)
  Peter Reid (2008–2009)
  Bryan Robson (2009–2011)
  Winfried Schäfer (2011–2013)
  Surachai Jaturapattarapong (2013)
  Kiatisuk Senamuang (2014–2017)
  Milovan Rajevac (2017–2019)
  Sirisak Yodyardthai (2019)
  Akira Nishino (2019–2021)
  Alexandré Pölking (2021–present)

Manager history
 after the match against .

Players

Current squad 
The following 25 players were called up for the friendly matches against Syria and United Arab Emirates.

Caps and goals as of 16 January 2023, after the match against Vietnam.

Recent call-ups
The following players have been called up within the last 12 months.

INJ Withdrew from the squad due to injury
PRE Included in the Preliminary squad or on standby
RET Retired from the national team
SUS Serving suspension from the national team
WD Withdrew from the squad due to non-injury issue

Player records

Players in bold are still active with Thailand.

Most appearances

Top goalscorers

Competitive record

FIFA World Cup

AFC Asian Cup

AFF Championship

Olympic Games

Asian Games

Southeast Asian Games 

Notes
 1 : The title was shared.
 * : Denotes draws including knockout matches decided on penalty kicks.

Head-to-head record

Honours

Continental titles 
 AFC Asian Cup
 Third place (1): 1972
 Asian Games
 Fourth place (2): 1990, 1998

Regional titles 
  AFF Championship
  Champions (7): 1996, 2000, 2002, 2014, 2016, 2020, 2022
 Runners-up (3): 2007, 2008, 2012
 Southeast Asian Games
 Gold medal (9): 1965*, 1975, 1981, 1983, 1985, 1993, 1995, 1997, 1999
 Silver medal (4): 1959, 1969, 1977, 1991
 Bronze medal (5): 1961, 1967, 1971, 1979, 1987

Friendly titles
 King's Cup
 Winners (15): 1976*, 1979, 1980*, 1981, 1982, 1984, 1989, 1990, 1992, 1994, 2000, 2006, 2007, 2016, 2017
 Runners-up (11): 1970, 1971, 1972, 1974, 1993, 1997, 2002, 2004, 2009, 2015, 2018
 Third place (12): 1968, 1973, 1986, 1987, 1988, 1989, 1996, 1999, 2001, 2003, 2013*, 2022
 China Cup
 Runners-up (1): 2019
 Indonesian Independence Cup
 Winners (1): 1994
 Korea Cup
 Third place (1): 1977*
 Fourth place (1): 1980
 VFF Vietnam International Friendly Cup
 Winners (2): 2006, 2008
 Nehru Cup
 Third place (1): 1995
 3 Nations in Taiwan
 Winners (1): 1971
 4 Nations in Indochina
 Winners (1): 1989
 Brunei Games
 Winners (1): 1990
Note
*trophy shared

See also 

 Thailand national under-23 football team
 Thailand national under-21 football team
 Thailand national under-20 football team
 Thailand national under-17 football team
 Thailand national futsal team
 King's Cup
 Football in Thailand
 Sport in Thailand

Note

References

External links 

 Football Association of Thailand
 Thai Football.com
 Thai football page of Fifa.com

 
Asian national association football teams